Two ships of the Royal Australian Navy (RAN) have been named HMAS Armidale, for the city of Armidale, New South Wales.

 , a Bathurst-class corvette launched in January 1942 and sunk by Japanese aircraft on 1 December 1942; the only ship of the class lost to enemy action
 A  announced in August 1980 was to be named Armidale, but the vessel was cancelled before construction
 , the lead ship of the Armidale-class patrol boats, was commissioned in 2005 and is active as of 2016

Battle honours
Three battle honours have been awarded to ships named HMAS Armidale:
 Darwin 1942
 Pacific 1942
 New Guinea 1942

References

Royal Australian Navy ship names